Blundell's School is an independent co-educational boarding and day school in the English public school tradition, located in Tiverton, Devon. It was founded in 1604 under the will of Peter Blundell, one of the richest men in England at the time, and moved to its present site on the outskirts of the town in 1882.

While the full boarding fees are £38,985 per year, the school offers several scholarships and bursaries, and provides flexi-boarding. The school has 360 boys and 225 girls, including 117 boys and 85 girls in the Sixth Form, and is a member of the Headmasters' and Headmistresses' Conference.

The Good Schools Guide calls Blundell's a "distinguished rural school of ancient lineage".

History

Peter Blundell, one of the wealthiest merchants of Elizabethan England, died in 1601, having made his fortune principally in the cloth industry. His will set aside considerable money and land to establish a school in his home town "to maintain sound learning and true religion". Blundell asked his friend John Popham, Lord Chief Justice of England, to carry out his wishes, and appointed a number of local merchants and gentry as his first trustees (known as feoffees). The position of feoffee is no longer hereditary, but a number of notable local families have held the position for a considerable period: the first ancestor of the current chairman of the governors to hold that position was elected more than 250 years ago, and the Heathcoat-Amory family have a long tradition of service on the Governing Body, since Sir John Heathcoat-Amory was appointed in 1865.

The Old Blundell's School was built to be much larger and grander than any other in the West Country, with room for 150 scholars and accommodation for a master and an usher. The Grade 1 listed building is now in the care of the National Trust and the forecourt is usually open to visitors. One ex-Blundell's boy was the writer R. D. Blackmore, who in the novel Lorna Doone set the stage for a fight between John Ridd and Robin Snell on the Blundell's triangular lawn.

Peter Blundell's executors established links with Balliol College, Oxford, and with Sidney Sussex College, Cambridge, and large sums were settled to provide for scholarships for pupils of the school to attend those colleges. The first Sidney Sussex scholar was nominated in 1610 and the first Blundell's Balliol scholar in 1615. The links with these colleges continue today, although without the closed scholarships.

In 1645 Thomas Fairfax used the school for his headquarters during the siege of Tiverton Castle.

In 1882, the school moved to the present Horsdon site, one mile from the original location. The new buildings were designed by Hayward & Son of Exeter, and built in red Halberton stone, the foundation stone was laid by the William Courtenay, 11th Earl of Devon, chairman of the governors, in 1880. Reginald Blomfield, the architect and garden designer, was responsible for the additions to the school, which were completed in 1901.

The School's war memorial was carved by the school's sculpture teacher, Estcourt J. Clack and is a replica of the Celtic cross in Eyam churchyard, but with the missing part intact.

The clock tower contains a statue by Alain John, a pupil of the School and aspiring sculptor, who joined the RAF as a navigator and was killed in the Second World War. The statue was subsequently re-cast at the commission of Neville Gorton, then Bishop of Coventry, and stands in the ruins of the old Coventry Cathedral as a memorial to those who lost their lives in the war.

In 1989, Ondaatje Hall was opened, following a donation by OB Christopher Ondaatje for its construction. Among its many facilities is a 150-seat professional theatre, which as well as putting on in-house productions is also used for public performances.

Girls were admitted from the age of 13 in 1993, to make the school fully co-educational. To make room for them, the boys' boarding house North Close was changed into a girls' house. In 1997, School House became a junior house for pupils aged 11–13.

The prep school St Aubyn's was moved to the Blundell's campus in 2000, taking over the day-boy house Milestones and the Sanatorium, and was renamed Blundell's Prep School. It has about 250 pupils aged from three years to eleven. The headmaster is Andy Southgate.

A change to the way the UVI boarders are housed took place when the old Westlake was sold off and a new Westlake built on the site of the CCF parade ground. Opened in 2004, the new Westlake houses all boys and girls who are in their final year.

The two latest developments to be completed are an extension to the Music School, and the building of the Popham Academic Centre, which houses the new Psychology, Economics and Business Studies departments, as well as the new server for the school intranet and a dedicated IT teaching area.

Sport

Rugby
Rugby is the main sport played at Blundell's in the Autumn and Spring terms. The earliest mention of "football" in the Blundellian was in 1861 and the first recorded "rugger" match played by boys at Blundell's was in 1868 against Tiverton Rugby Club, making the school one of the oldest anywhere formally to play the game. The Blundell's crest still hangs in the main room at Twickenham in recognition of this.

The first OB to gain International Honours was R. S. Kindersley for England in 1884 and on 1 January 1908 Thomas Kelly captained England to a 19–0 victory over France.

The strongest years for Blundell's were the two decades after World War 2, when Clem Thomas gained 26 caps for Wales in 1949–59 (in 1958–59 as captain), Richard Sharp won 14 caps for England 1960-67 (Captain 1963 and 1967) and David Shepherd won five caps for Australia in 1964–66. Both Thomas and Sharp played in two tests for Britain in South Africa.

Also of note was Charles Kent, who played for Rosslyn Park and England, having previously won four Blues playing for Oxford, including one as captain in 1974.

Blundell's won the Rosslyn Park National Sevens title in 1981 and won the second ever Open Final 28–0 against Dulwich College, in 1940. The Blundell's XVs continue to compete among the public schools of the South West, with Bryanston, Millfield, Cheltenham College and Clifton College among their regular opponents.

OBs Dave Lewis Gloucester Rugby, Matt Kvesic and Will Carrick-Smith Exeter Chiefs all currently play in the Aviva Premiership.

Jack Maunder is an English rugby union player who plays scrum-half for Exeter Chiefs in the Aviva Premiership.

Sam Maunder, brother of Jack Maunder, plays for England U18 squad.

The Russell
One annual tradition is the school's cross-country run known as the Russell, named after OB Jack Russell, a vicar and dog-breeder. It was first run in 1887, and 2009 saw the 129th run. The Russell course crosses both public and private land with the permission of local landowners. As such, the route has undergone numerous changes throughout its history. The current senior course is 4.85 miles and includes a notorious’Heartbreak Hill’. Although the junior race and a ‘fun run’ follow shorter routes, all participants encounter the muddiest sections. Parents, staff and OB’s may participate in the ‘Open’ which follows the senior route.

Cricket at the 1900 Olympics
Four Old Blundellians played in the gold medal-winning Great Britain cricket team at the 1900 Summer Olympics, the only time cricket featured in the Olympics. Britain was represented by an unofficial touring club team, the Devon & Somerset Wanderers Cricket Club (formed by William Donne in 1894 and made up of Old Blundellians and members of Castle Cary Cricket Club).

Southern Railway Schools Class

The School lent its name to the thirty-third steam locomotive (Engine 932) in the Southern Railway's Class V of which there were 40. This class was also known as the Schools Class because all 40 of the class were named after prominent English public schools. Blundell's, as it was called, was built in 1934. The locomotive bearing the school's name was withdrawn from service in January 1961. In 2009 Hornby produced a model of this particular Schools class locomotive. As the product photograph shows, while the name of this locomotive has been variously quoted as Blundells or Blundell's, the apostrophe does actually appear on the nameplate.

Old Blundellians

The first known society of former pupils, known as Old Blundellians (OBs), was established as early as 1725.

William Hogarth engraved the letterhead for the invitation to a dinner for former pupils of the School in 1725 and the Ticket for Tiverton School Feast in 1740, (image of print courtesy of Antiqueprints.com).

Notable former pupils include:

A–D
Robert Arundell, Governor of the Windward Islands and Barbados
Vernon Bartlett, journalist and politician
Edward Bellew, drainage inspector and winner of the Victoria Cross
Dominic Bess, England cricketer
R. D. Blackmore, author of Lorna Doone
Richard Bowring, Master of Selwyn College, Cambridge
William Buckland, geologist
William Edward Buckley, professor of Anglo-Saxon 
George Bull, theologian and bishop
Giles Bullard, High Commissioner to the West Indies
Charles Campion, food critic
Bampfylde Moore Carew, rogue and imposter
Aelred Carlyle, missionary and monk
Frederick William Cuming, 1900 Olympic gold medal winner as part of the UK cricket team
Charles Cornwallis Chesney, soldier and military writer
George Tomkyns Chesney, soldier and novelist
Ben Collins, Formula 3 racing driver and the infamous Stig
John Conybeare, Bishop of Bristol and notable 18th-century theologian
John Davis, Welsh cricketer
Edward Dayman, hymn writer

E–K
John Ebdon, writer
John Eliot, English statesman
Tristan Evans, Drummer & backing vocals for UK based band The Vamps
Charles Rossiter Forwood, lawyer and Attorney General of Fiji
Francis Fulford, Anglo-Catholic bishop of Montreal
John Gay, philosopher
Anthony Gifford, cricketer and educator
Michael Gilbert, writer of fictional mysteries and thrillers
Douglas Gracey, Commander in Chief Pakistan Army 1948-51
Charles Harper, Governor and Commander-in-Chief of St. Helena 1925–1932
C. Brian Haselgrove mathematician best known for disproving the Pólya conjecture in 1958
Thomas Hayter, bishop of Norwich 1749–61, bishop of London 1761–62
Abraham Hayward, man of letters
Archibald Hill, Nobel Prize winner
David Gordon Hines, developer of co-operatives in Tanganyika and Uganda
Peter Gordon Hines (Civil Engineer) in Hong Kong, Bangkok, Sumatra, UK, Nigeria, Australia, Romania
Walter Hook, Tractarian vicar of Leeds
Ella Hunt, actress, dickinson, anna and the apocalypse, intruders
James Jeremie, academic and churchman
John Jeremie, governor of Sierra Leone
C. E. M. Joad, intellectual, broadcasting personality and fare dodger
Philip Keun, Special Operations Executive Captain and co-leader of the Jade-Amicol French resistance network.

L–R
Geoffrey Lampe, theologian and winner of the Military Cross
Wilfrid Le Gros Clark, surgeon, primatologist and paleoanthropologist who disproved Piltdown Man
Robin Lloyd-Jones, Author
Jeremy Lloyds, Test Cricket umpire
George Malcolm, army officer
Thomas Manton, Puritan clergyman
John Margetson, former British Ambassador to Vietnam, the United Nations, and the Netherlands.
Vic Marks, Somerset and England cricketer
Professor John Marrack, DSO, MC, Emeritus Professor of Chemical Pathology in the University of London
John Marrack, (10 February 1921 – 7 November 2009) naval officer, Queen's Harbourmaster 1962.
Claire Marshall, journalist
Michael Mates, former MP (constituency of East Hampshire)
Hugh Morris, England cricketer and current Managing Director of the England and Wales Cricket Board
Gordon Newton, Editor of the Financial Times
Christopher Ondaatje, author and donor to the Labour Party
William Pillar, Fourth Sea Lord and Chief of Naval Supplies
John de la Pole, 6th Baronet
Ben Rice, novelist
Jack Russell, Victorian hunting parson, dog breeder

S–Z
Peter Schidlof, Austrian-British violist and co-founder of the Amadeus Quartet
Edward Seymour, 16th Duke of Somerset
Evelyn Seymour, 17th Duke of Somerset
Percy Seymour, 18th Duke of Somerset
Richard Sharp, England rugby captain
Richard Shore, cricketer
Frederick Spring, senior army officer
Trevor Spring, army officer
J. C. Squire, poet, writer, historian, and influential literary editor
Donald Stokes, industrialist and peer
Jon Swain, award-winning writer, whose memoirs were portrayed in the film The Killing Fields
Frederick Temple, Archbishop of Canterbury
Clem Thomas, Wales Rugby Captain
Georgia "Toff" Toffolo, television and media personality
Charles Trevelyan, 1st Baronet, English civil servant, governor of Madras
Henry Hawkins Tremayne, creator of the Lost Gardens of Heligan
John Van der Kiste, author
Walter Walker, controversial soldier and writer
Arthur Graeme West, war poet
John Whiteley, Deputy Chief of the Imperial General Staff 1949–53
Cyril Wilkinson, Great Britain hockey player and Olympic Gold Medallist
Geoffrey Willans, humorist and co-author of Nigel Molesworth series
Matthew Wood, 1st Baronet, Lord Mayor of London, MP for the City of London and close friend of Queen Caroline
John Wyndham, author whose work included The Day of the Triffids

Headteachers

Notable former masters

Former masters of Blundell's have included:
Terry Barwell, cricketer
Estcourt J Clack (Jim Clack), woodwork teacher and sculptor of the Diana Fountain in London's Green Park
Manning Clark, historian
Neville Gorton, Bishop of Coventry
Malcolm Moss, politician
Grahame Parker, sportsman
C. Northcote Parkinson, naval historian and author of the bestselling book Parkinson's Law
Gilbert Phelps, writer and broadcaster
Lawrence Sail, poet
Willi Soukop, sculptor
Stephen Spender, poet and essayist
Mervyn Stockwood, missioner to the School and later Bishop of Southwark
Samuel Wesley (the Younger), poet and churchman

References

External links

Blundell's School website
2001 UK:Independent Schools Inspectorate Report
Current Information from UK:Independent Schools Council

1604 establishments in England
Educational institutions established in the 1600s
Private schools in Devon
Member schools of the Headmasters' and Headmistresses' Conference
Tiverton, Devon
Boarding schools in Devon